The Center on Wrongful Convictions of Youth (the "CWCY"), part of Northwestern University Pritzker School of Law's Bluhm Legal Clinic, is a non-profit legal clinic that represents children who have been convicted of crimes they did not commit.  Founded by Northwestern Law Professor Steven Drizin and directed by Professor Laura Nirider, it is the first organization in the world to focus exclusively on wrongfully convicted children.  Through its intertwined research, scholarship, teaching, and advocacy, the Center has developed expertise in the problem of false confessions, police interrogation practices, and constitutional doctrine governing the interrogation room.

In collaboration with partners across the United States, the CWCY is active in the federal and state appellate, post-conviction, and habeas corpus process.  Its faculty and students not only represent individual wrongly convicted youth, but they also submit amicus curiae (friend-of-the-court) briefs before courts around the globe, including the United States Supreme Court, which cited the Center as an authority on juvenile false confessions in the 2011 case J.D.B. v. North Carolina.  The Center's faculty are particularly active in the public outreach and professional education space, speaking widely about interrogations and confessions before audiences that range from legal stakeholders like judges, attorneys, police, and law professors to the general public at events hosted by institutions of higher education, religious organizations, and corporate sponsors. Its faculty have also been quoted widely in media reports and academic articles addressing wrongful convictions, interrogations, and confessions.

Since its founding by Steven Drizin in 2009, the Center on Wrongful Convictions of Youth's faculty and students have helped free more than 20 wrongfully convicted youth through the post-conviction and habeas process, many of whom were serving life sentences.  Its clients have included Brendan Dassey, whose case rose to international prominence via the Netflix series Making a Murderer, and Damien Echols of the so-called West Memphis Three, whose case rose to prominence via a series of documentary films including HBO's "Paradise Lost: The Child Murders at Robin Hood Hills" and Sir Peter Jackson's "West of Memphis."

History
Launched at Northwestern Pritzker School of Law in October 2009, the Center on Wrongful Convictions of Youth was a joint initiative between Northwestern Law's Center for Wrongful Convictions and the Children and Family Justice Center with a defined purpose of representing and advocating for wrongfully convicted youth.

Founded by the then-legal director of the Center on Wrongful Convictions, scholar and advocate Professor Steven Drizin, the CWCY is now spearheaded by Drizin, Clinical Assistant Professor of Law and Director Laura Nirider, and a group of Northwestern Law students who work alongside CWCY faculty and pro bono attorneys in a rigorous intellectual environment.

In addition to its high-profile representation of Making a Murderer subject Brendan Dassey and West Memphis Three member Damien Echols, the CWCY has played a central role in more than 20 cases that have resulted in exoneration through the post-conviction and habeas process.  In 2011, CWCY faculty and students used DNA evidence to help exonerate two groups of wrongfully convicted Chicago-area teenagers in widely followed twin murder cases known as the Dixmoor Five and Englewood Four. Both cases involved multiple false confessions from teens. Those cases were nationally noted because in each case, groups of children were convicted of rape-murder charges—despite DNA evidence excluding all of them at the time of trial—on the basis of false confessions.

Also in 2011, Center faculty and students joined a team of attorneys who won the release of three Arkansas men who had been convicted as teens in the internationally-known case of the West Memphis Three.

Film

Making a Murderer Seasons 1 & 2, Emmy-winning Netflix Global series addressing the case of Brendan Dassey
West of Memphis  BAFTA-nominated documentary about the West Memphis Three.
 Dateline NBC, "The Interrogation," featuring Laura Nirider as an interrogation expert in the case of Virginia teenager Robert Davis.
A True Story of a False Confession: The Brendan Dassey Case a discussion on Brendan Dasseys case, police interrogations, and false confessions. Livestream from Northwestern Pritzker School of Law.

Podcasts

Concord Law School: Discussion between Professor Steven Drizin and Martin Pritkin (Dean of Concord Law School) concerning the wrongful conviction of juveniles.
Undisclosed: with Rabia Chaudry and Professors Drizin and Nirider. Discussion on Dassey v Dittman before the United States Supreme Court
Scalar Learning Podcast: Huzefa interviews Professor Steve Drizin.
Planet Lex Podcast: Professors Drizin and Nirider interviewed on defending Brendan Dassey of Making a Murderer.

See also

 List of wrongful convictions in the United States
 Juvenile Law Center
 Centurion Ministries
 Innocence Project
 Saul Kassin
 International Association of Chiefs of Police
 Martin Tankleff
 Jeffrey Mark Deskovic
 Miscarriage of Justice

References

External links
 

Social justice organizations
2009 establishments in Illinois
Advocacy groups in the United States